Andrea Jeanette "Annie" Clark (born June 4, 1992), is a Canadian actress.

Career
Clark joined Degrassi: The Next Generation in 2009, playing the role of Fiona Coyne; she continued to play Fiona on the show through 2013. In 2013 she starred in the Canadian thriller film Solo. In 2014 Clark co-starred in the movie Teen Lust, playing Denise the prospective girlfriend of the lead character Neil (Jesse Carere).

Filmography

References

External links 

1992 births
Canadian child actresses
Canadian film actresses
Canadian television actresses
Canadian voice actresses
Living people
Actresses from Toronto